Maureen Okpoko  is a Nigerian actress. In 2016, she was nominated for Africa Movie Academy Award for Best Actress in a Supporting Role.

Career 
In 2013, she starred in Golden Egg, which also featured Justus Esiri. In a 2015 interview, she revealed that Duplex was the most challenging role she has played. Speaking about what she can't do in a film, she stated that she wouldn't act nude, mainly because she would not look nice unclothed. Okpoko has also featured in several Nigerian television series including Dear Mother, Clinic Matters, Neta, University Mafias, Sorrowful Child, Sacrifice the Baby, Red Scorpion, and Baby Oku. In 2015, she acted alongside Majid Michel and Beverly Naya in The Madman I Love. Okpoko was also one of the cast members in Uche Jombo's Good Home (2016), which featured Okey Uzoeshi and Seun Akindele. The film plot addressed human trafficking from the Nigerian perspective

Personal life 
Okpoko is a native of Anambra State. She is of Nigerian and Jamaican descent. She is married with three children.

See also
 List of Nigerian actors

References

External links 
 

Living people
Nigerian people of Jamaican descent
21st-century Nigerian actresses
Actresses from Anambra State
Year of birth missing (living people)
Igbo people
Nigerian film actresses